Cyperus secubans is a species of sedge that is native to parts of eastern Australia.

See also 
 List of Cyperus species

References 

secubans
Plants described in 1991
Flora of New South Wales